The 1996 United States Shadow Senator election in the District of Columbia took place on November 11, 1996, to elect a shadow member to the United States Senate to represent the District of Columbia. The member was only recognized by the District of Columbia and not officially sworn or seated by the United States Senate. Incumbent Shadow Senator Jesse Jackson decided not to run for reelection. Local ANC Commissioner and lawyer Paul Strauss easily won the primary against little-known Eduardo Burkhart and also won the general election.

Primary elections 
Party primaries took place on September 10, 1996.

Democratic primary

Candidates 
 Paul Strauss, lawyer and ANC Commissioner
 Eduardo Burkhart

Declined 
 Jesse Jackson, incumbent Shadow Senator

Results

General election 
Strauss faced Republican Gloria R. Corn, and Umoja candidate George Pope. As is usual for Democrats in the District, Strauss won in a landslide.

Candidates 
 Paul Strauss (Democratic)
 Gloria R. Corn (Republican)
 George Pope (Umoja)

Results

References 

1996 elections in Washington, D.C.
Washington, D.C., Shadow Senator elections